Public transport ticketing in New South Wales, Australia operated using magnetic-stripe technology between 1989 and 2016. This ticketing system, known variously as the Automated fare collection system, STATS and, from 2010, MyZone, was progressively replaced by a contactless smart card called Opal between 2012 and 2016.

Flimseys
From the 1950s until the 1990s, single bus tickets were printed in blocks of 250 and stapled together. These tear-off tickets, known as 'flimseys', were initially issued by conductors. Conductors were progressively withdrawn, with drivers issuing tickets from the early 1980s onwards. State Transit withdrew flimseys in 1992.

The first multi-modal periodical tickets, called TravelPass, went on sale in September 1983 under the Wran State Government. Initially TravelPass was a flash pass system.

Early automatic ticket validation
Magnetic-stripe tickets were first used in Sydney on the Eastern Suburbs Railway line, from its opening on 23 June 1979. Integrated bus-rail tickets were also available for this line.

An automated multi-ride ticket system called MetroTen, based on optical mark recognition rather than magnetic stripe technology, was used on Sydney's government buses from 1985 until 1992. In general, however, many Sydney commuters used paper tickets specific to the mode of transport on which they were purchased until the mid-1980s.

The early systems, along with the simple paper tickets used on the rail network, made policing fare compliance somewhat labour-intensive. Originally the railways had ticket collectors or inspectors at the exit of every station. Bus services had drivers, and previously conductors, selling or checking periodical tickets. The cost-saving reduction of ticketing staff on state public transport resulted in the responsibility for fare compliance being transferred from the service operators onto the passengers. This change sometimes resulted in revenue loss. For example, Urban Transit's MetroTen was easily and frequently defrauded by passengers. Of the "el cheapo Metroten ticketing system that the former Labor Government installed", transport minister Bruce Baird told Parliament, "Many people know that rorting has gone on. ... The system is outdated and has outlived its usefulness."

Tackling fare evasion was also at the heart of automated ticketing on the rail network. Baird told Parliament that under the Wran and Unsworth governments, "between 10 and 20 per cent" were checked and that this had risen to "between 50 per cent and 60 per cent" since the Greiner government took office. "With automatic fare collection," Baird told Parliament, "85 per cent of all tickets will be checked regularly. It is estimated that somewhere in the range of $20 million to $30 million each year will be collected by way of revenue that should have been paid for travel on State Rail."

Magnetic-stripe tickets
An automated fare collection system was officially launched by Sydney Ferries services provided by the State Transit Authority on Monday 10 July 1989, following trial use by Manly Hydrofoil passengers on Friday 7 July. This replaced a system of paper tickets, token (coin) operated turnstiles and flash periodical passes (including the existing TravelPass range). State Transit installed ticket vending machines and ticket barriers at Circular Quay and Manly, the main wharves in its network. The operation of the ferries ticketing system was the focus of a corruption inquiry in 1999.

On 31 August 1992, State Transit introduced automated fare collection to its Sydney and Newcastle bus networks as the State Transit automated ticketing system, or STATS. The change was heralded by the installation of a Datafare 2000 drivers' console and two AES Prodata green ticket machines (later known as validators) in each of State Transit's 1,600 buses.

CityRail's adoption of automated ticketing was more fraught, occurring late and over budget. Officials blamed the size of the rail system. While the State Transit equipped two stops—Circular Quay and Manly—with ticket vending machines, CityRail was required to outfit almost 300 stations with them. The government was forced to allay fears that automated ticketing would mean that more stations would have staffing withdrawn once vending machines were in place.

Automatic ticketing, including vending machines and ticket barriers, was introduced to the CityRail network over 12 months between July 1992 and July 1993, at a cost of some $90 million.

First generation products
With State Transit's bus and ferry network now sharing a ticketing technology with the State Rail Authority (after the initial ferry implementation had its ticket data format revised to the new common standard), a range of multi-modal magnetic-stripe tickets could be introduced. These included previously introduced but non-magnetic stripe TravelPass, DayTripper and the Pensioner Excursion Ticket. State Rail also offered combined tickets with private operators, notably BusPlus with private bus operators in Western Sydney and the Central Coast, TramLink with the Sydney Light Rail operator, and Blue Mountains ExplorerLink with the operator of a tourist bus loop in Katoomba.

Among the government public transport operators:

 CityRail issued magnetic-stripe tickets (and until August 1993 new format non-magnetic-stripe paper tickets), including periodicals covering 7, 14, 28, 90 and 365-day periods.
 State Transit buses issued paper tickets for single fares, purchased on-board buses using cash with the bus drivers. Ten-trip magnetic-stripe tickets called TravelTen, weekly TravelPass periodicals, as well as DayTripper, BusTripper and Pensioner Excursion (day) Tickets (P.E.T.s), were available at Transit Shops, bus depots, railway stations and newsagents. "Tripper" day tickets and P.E.T.s were also sold on-board buses from the bus drivers.
 Sydney Ferries, then part of State Transit, issued magnetic-stripe tickets for single fares, with ten-trip magnetic-stripe tickets called FerryTen, and the full range of magnetic-stripe version TravelPass periodicals (being available from July 1989 system introduction), DayTrippers and P.E.T.s, at major wharves (via vending machines and BOMs) and later newsagents.

PrePay
PrePay was a concept introduced by State Transit in 2004, where a ticket has to be purchased before boarding the bus. This meant that bus tickets could not be bought from the driver, and prepaid magnetic-stripe tickets have to be purchased beforehand before getting on the bus. Tickets accepted included the TravelTen, DayTripper, P.E.T.s etc.

PrePay only bus stops are bus stops which are PrePay only between 7am and 7pm on weekdays. During this time, no cash was accepted on any State Transit route when getting on from any of these stops and a prepaid magnetic stripe ticket have to be used instead. The first bus stop to be trialed and converted to a PrePay only bus stop was the Watson Street bus stop along Military Road in 2004. Subsequently, other busy bus corridors and interchanges were progressively converted to become PrePay only on weekdays. Bus stops within the CBD also became PrePay only bus stops on 22 June 2009.

State Transit also introduced its first PrePay only service 333 in October 2006 between Circular Quay and Bondi Beach. Similar to PrePay only bus stops, cash was not accepted but expanded to any bus stop along the route and during any time of the day. Subsequently, other State Transit limited stops and express routes were also progressively converted to PrePay only services. The first five Metrobus routes (M10-M40, M50) were also PrePay only since introduction. During the transition to MyZone, prepaid magnetic-stripe MyZone tickets replaced the older State Transit-only magnetic-stripe tickets and became the only tickets accepted on PrePay only bus routes. MyZone tickets accepted on PrePay only services and bus stops included MyMulti tickets, MyBus TravelTen tickets, Family Funday Sunday and P.E.T.s. When the Opal card was rolled out, it was also accepted on PrePay only routes and bus stops.

The concept of requiring a prepaid ticket and refusing cash payments was also later used by other bus operators, such as Forest Coach Lines services at certain bus stops at certain times on weekdays (since March 2013).

Commencing in 2018 all bus routes are progressively being converted to prepay only by region.  On 28 October 2019 the last routes within the CBD became cashless so that specific cashless stops within that area are no longer used.  During the COVID-19 pandemic all Opal bus services became cashless.

MyZone
The ticketing system was expanded and rebranded with new ticket stock and new fare products. Introduced in April 2010, MyZone somewhat standardised fare product names and ticket designs across trains, buses and ferries; and brought privately operated buses into the same fare structure as those operated by the State Transit Authority. Limited integration with the then privately owned light rail system was added in 2011. For many passengers, particularly those travelling longer distances, the reduction in the number of fare bands meant substantial price cuts for public transport. However, critics noted that MyZone represented little more than a redesign of tickets for the existing TravelPass fare collection system, and pointed to the Labor government's failure to implement Tcard, a smart card system abandoned following trials in 2007.

Like the previous ticketing range, MyZone used the existing magnetic-stripe automated fare collection system on trains, government buses and ferries. Private bus services and the light rail required manual checking or validation of the ticket by the driver or conductor.

History
Introduced in April 2010, MyZone was designed to simplify the city's claimed complex fare system, reducing the 20 train fare zones to five, the five bus zones to three, and the five ferry zones to two, thus removing one of the reported stumbling blocks to the integration of ticketing and the introduction of a smart card. The changes were welcomed by Infrastructure Partnerships Australia, but criticised by the independent pricing regulator Independent Pricing and Regulatory Tribunal, which was not consulted and by the Independent Public Inquiry into a Long-Term Public Transport Plan for Sydney. while the lobby group Action for Public Transport welcomed the changes with some reservations

Then Shadow Minister for Transport Gladys Berejiklian criticised the MyZone system, claiming the government merely replaced one clumsy system for another. She urged the replacement of the paper-based ticketing system with an electronic one.

From June 2011, the MyZone system was extended to the then privately owned light rail system. MyMulti tickets and the non-MyZone Pensioner Excursion Ticket and Family Funday Sunday are recognised on the light rail.

From 1 September 2013, changes were made to MyMulti eligibility on ferries, with usage restrictions replacing unrestricted travel. MyMulti 1 tickets were no longer accepted and the MyMulti 2 could only be used for journeys up to 9 km. The MyMulti 3 continued to offer unrestricted travel.

Public testing of a reintroduced STATS magnetic-stripe ticketing system commenced in June 2019. The system is for public use but is restricted to special excursion trips operated by two Sydney transport heritage groups. The two groups have each had fresh magnetic-stripe ticket stock produced.

Ticket types

MyZone consisted of four main ticket types: MyTrain, MyBus, MyFerry and MyMulti – a multi-modal ticket.

Existing single, return, weekly and other periodical ticket products were rebranded as "MyTrain", and the number of fare bands was reduced from 20 to five. Train fares continued to be distance-based; periodical ticket discounts remained unchanged. Existing bus TravelTen tickets were rebranded as "MyBus TravelTen", and the number of section bands was reduced to three. The tickets became valid for travel on privately operated buses for the first time, by giving the tickets to the bus drivers to validate, different to machine validation on State Transit services. Bus fares continued to be based on sections. Existing ferry FerryTen tickets were rebranded as "MyFerry TravelTen".

Existing multi-modal tickets TravelPass, DayTripper and BusPlus were replaced with a series of periodical train, bus and ferry tickets called MyMulti. A MyMulti ticket offered unlimited bus and ferry travel and train travel within a given zone. Zone MyMulti1 covered inner city trains, MyMulti2 covered most of the suburban Sydney train network and MyMulti3 covered all suburban, intercity and regional trains of the CityRail network.

The introduction of MyZone did not alter the existing TravelPass, TimeTen or timed ticket products used in Newcastle. Additionally all Sydney TravelPass tickets remained valid until the magnetic-stripe ticketing system was no longer available from 1 August 2016.

Post withdrawal reintroduction of Magnetic Stripe Ticketing

Public testing of a reintroduced STATS magnetic stripe ticketing system commenced in June 2019. The system's use is restricted to special excursion trips operated by two Sydney transport heritage groups. The two groups have each had fresh magnetic stripe ticket stock produced.

Gallery

Smart card ticketing

Tcard

Tcard was a failed attempt to introduce an inter-modal stored-value transport smart card, similar to Hong Kong's Octopus Card system, originally intended to be in place before the 2000 Sydney Olympics.

In 2007, the state government terminated the project and the $64 million investment had been written off. ERG Group and the independent regulator attributed some of the delays to CityRail's complex fare structure.

A replacement system, based on smart card technology, was first announced by the Government of New South Wales in 1996, with hopes of a system to be in place before the 2000 Summer Olympics. Like the seamless transition from paper to magnetic stripe tickets, it was initially anticipated the full range of existing magnetic-strip tickets (including TravelPass periodicals) would be brought across to the new contactless-smart-card platform.

The Government put the project up for tender. Award of the contract was held up, due to legal action taken by an unsuccessful tenderer. As a result, the contract to install and operate the integrated ticketing project, or Tcard, as the plan became known, was finalised and awarded to the ERG Group at the end of 2002.

In 2005, a limited trial of the technology involving school children using the School Student Transport Scheme was undertaken, and expanded to cover all private-sector bus services in 2006.

In a bid to smooth the introduction of Tcard, the government established the Public Transport Ticketing Corporation to oversee the project. The corporation commenced operations in July 2006. Originally slated for a 2007 introduction, the Tcard rollout timetable project was pushed back. Ridiculing the revised timetable, opposition transport spokesman Barry O'Farrell told Parliament that "The only smart move by the Minister for Transport is putting off implementation of the full operation of the Tcard until after the 2007 state election campaign."

In mid-2006, the future of the project was in doubt as ERG Group was forced to borrow $14 million to prop up company finances. The government moved to renegotiate the contract, having already spent $54 million.

In April 2007, an official letter from the Public Transport Ticketing Corporation was sent to ERG Group expressing numerous concerns, such as software problems dogging the project.

Beginning in August 2006, commuter field trials were held on selected lines of Sydney Buses and the Punchbowl Bus Company. The trials hit a hitch when bus drivers threatened a boycott due to the machine crashing when printing tickets, distracting drivers, which in turn led to alleged safety issues. One bus driver claimed to have been so distracted by a Tcard machine that he  forgot to put on the handbrake and the bus rolled 10 metres into a council garden from a stop on the steep road at the Balmain East terminus; other explanations of this and similar 'bus rollaway' incidents are plausible. Discontent among workers involved with the trial renewed calls for the Tcard system to be scrapped. The Tcard bus trial was being conducted during negotiation of a new enterprise agreement, and it is possible that the trial was being used as leverage, by the RTBU, in wage negotiations.

On 9 November 2007, the Government of NSW issued a notice of intention to terminate the contract with ERG. On 23 January 2008, the NSW government announced it had terminated the contract and would be seeking to recover $95 million from ERG.

On 18 March 2008, the School Student Transport Scheme Tcard system was switched off in response to the terminated contract.

On 3 July 2008, after three months of a terminated contract and a $200 million lawsuit by ERG Group, it was revealed that the a smartcard system project had been revived by cabinet. This decision also required the state government to change the structure of its fare system to suit the new system.

On 17 February 2012, the Tcard legal dispute was settled.

On 12 April 2010, the Government of New South Wales announced that a new contract had been awarded to the Pearl Consortium for the roll-out of a new system. It was announced in September 2011 that the new system would be called Opal.

Opal

The Opal ticketing system replaced other tickets. The pre-existing magnetic-stripe system tickets were retired in stages:

 From 1 June 2014, Pensioner Excursion Tickets, MyMulti Daypass and Family Funday Sunday tickets were no longer available for purchase onboard all State Transit buses, and had to be pre-purchased before boarding.
 14 tickets (mostly periodicals) were withdrawn on 1 September 2014.
 11 Newcastle-specific tickets were withdrawn on 20 November 2014.
 On 1 January 2016 all other paper tickets were withdrawn except single and return tickets for trains, ferries and light rail and single bus tickets, (both adult and concession).
 The last remaining tickets were withdrawn on 1 August 2016. Single trip Opal tickets serve as their partial replacement. Single trip ticket machines were rolled-out during 2016.

See also
 Manual fare collection, the alternative to Automated Fare Collection
 Metcard, a magnetic stripe based integrated ticketing system for Melbourne, Australia, based on similar hardware to Sydney's AFC
 myki, the replacement for Metcard in Melbourne

References

External links
New South Wales Parliament: Question Without Notice 22 April 1993
New South Wales Parliament: Question Without Notice 21 October 1992
New South Wales Parliament: Joint Estimates Committee, Transport, 21 October 1992
Powerhouse Museum: New South Wales railway tickets
Automated fare collection systems (AFCS) in Russian Federation

Transport in Sydney
Fare collection systems in Australia
History of transport in New South Wales

ko:자동 요금 징수